The Conservatoire de Luxembourg is a conservatoire in Luxembourg City, in southern Luxembourg.  The conservatoire was founded in 1906, after a private donation made possible its establishment, which had been mandated under a Grand Ducal decree issued in 1904.  The conservatoire currently has over 2,600 students, from 60 countries, studying over 5,000 courses in total.

It is located on Campus Geesseknäppchen, along with several other educational institutions; most of the campus lies in Hollerich, but the western part, in which the Conservatoire is located, is in Merl quarter.

The need for a new building emerged in the 1970s as a result of increasing demand. The foundation stone for the building on rue Charles Martel was laid on 19 June 1981, leading to the building's inauguration in 1984. There is a Westenfelder organ in the conservatoire's grand auditorium, the first concert hall organ in Luxembourg. The auditorium's excellent acoustics have attracted a wide range of performing artists including Bernard Haitink, Mstislav Rostropovich, Martha Argerich, Felicity Lott and Lazar Berman.

The conservatoire also houses a museum of early instruments, a specialist library, a music library and a large archive of musical works.

Footnotes

External links
  Official website http://www.conservatoire.lu/

Music schools in Luxembourg
Music venues in Luxembourg City
Education in Luxembourg City
Educational institutions established in 1906
1906 establishments in Luxembourg